Volochaninovo is a rural locality (a village) in Podlesnoye Rural Settlement, Vologodsky District, Vologda Oblast, Russia. The population was 15 as of 2002.

Geography 
Volochaninovo is located between Kharachevo and Burlevo. Volochaninovo is located 10 km southeast of Vologda (the district's administrative centre) by road. Kharachevo is the nearest rural locality.

References 

Rural localities in Vologodsky District